Wayne Thomas Patterson is a fraudster who used 123 different identities to defraud the Ministry of Social Development (MSD) in New Zealand of an estimate $3.48 million in welfare benefits during 2003 and 2006.

External links 

New Zealand fraudsters
New Zealanders convicted of fraud
Living people
Year of birth missing (living people)
Place of birth missing (living people)